The 2021–22 Seattle Kraken season was the inaugural season for the National Hockey League (NHL) franchise. They played their home games at Climate Pledge Arena. The Kraken played their first regular season game on October 12, 2021 against the Vegas Golden Knights, a 4–3 loss on the road. In their second game just two days later, the Kraken earned their first win in franchise history, defeating the Nashville Predators 4–3 in an away game.

The Kraken played their first home game on October 23, 2021 against the Vancouver Canucks, a 4–2 loss.

The franchise recorded its first ever shutout on February 2, 2022, defeating the New York Islanders 3–0 at home in Seattle.

The team retired the jersey number 32 on October 23, 2021, immediately before they played their first ever regular season home game, in recognition of the franchise being the 32nd to join the NHL and in honor of the 32,000 fans who placed deposits for tickets on the first possible day.

On March 30, 2022, the Kraken were eliminated from playoff contention after a 3–0 loss to the Vegas Golden Knights.

The Kraken suffered a heavily losing season, finishing last in the Pacific Division with 60 points, the second worst in the Western Conference.

Standings

Divisional standings

Conference standings

Schedule and results

Preseason
The preseason schedule was announced on July 9, 2021. With Climate Pledge Arena not scheduled to open until mid-October, the Kraken instead played their home preseason games at three different WHL arenas in Washington. On September 26, 2021, the Kraken beat the Vancouver Canucks 5–3, giving them their first preseason win in franchise history.

Regular season
The regular season schedule was released on July 22, 2021, with only about a handful of games scheduled in February as a result of NHL players participating in the 2022 Winter Olympics.

Player statistics

Skaters

Goaltenders

†Denotes player spent time with another team before joining the Kraken. Stats reflect time with the Kraken only.
‡Denotes player was traded mid-season. Stats reflect time with the Kraken only.

Player awards

After their final home game on April 29, the Kraken announced the inaugural winners of their player awards for the season.

Jared McCann won the Pete Muldoon Award for the Kraken's most valuable player, as voted on by Seattle-area media. Philipp Grubauer won the Three Stars of the Year Award for having accrued the most stars of any player using a point system for stars at home games. Yanni Gourde won the Guyle Fielder Award as the teammate who best exemplified "perseverence, hustle and dedication" as voted upon by his teammates and coaches. Gourde also won the Fan Favorite Award, determined by a fan vote.

Transactions
The Kraken have been involved in the following transactions during the 2021–22 season.

Trades

Players acquired

Players lost

Signings

Draft picks

Expansion draft

Seattle filled its roster by selecting players in the 2021 NHL Expansion Draft. The 2021 draft used the same rules as the 2017 NHL Expansion Draft did for the Vegas Golden Knights. The Kraken had to select or sign one player from each existing team except for Vegas. Teams opted to protect some of their players against being drafted.

Entry draft
Before the draft lottery, the Kraken were given the same odds as the team with the third worst point total from 2020–21 season, which meant that they would not draft any lower than fifth overall and would draft third in each subsequent round. On June 2, 2021, the Kraken received a second overall pick in the 2021 NHL Entry Draft during the draft lottery.

Below are the Seattle Kraken's selections at the 2021 NHL Entry Draft, which was held on July 23 and 24, 2021, virtually via video conference call from the NHL Network studios in Secaucus, New Jersey, due to the COVID-19 pandemic.

References

Seattle Kraken seasons
Seattle
Seattle Kraken
Seattle Kraken
Seattle Kraken